The 2021-22 Mongolian National Premier League is the 54th season of the Mongolian National Premier League.

Teams

League table

Top goalscorers

Mongolia Premier League seasons